The surname Collins has a variety of likely origins in Britain and Ireland:

 English and Scottish: A patronymic surname based on the English and Scottish name Colin, an English diminutive form of Nicholas.
 Norse: From the Old Norse personal name "Kollungr", a form of "koli" which in Old English became 'Cola', meaning swarthy or dark.
 Irish: The medieval surname was Ua Cuiléin, which has usually become Ó Coileáin today.
 Welsh: Collen; "hazel, hazel grove".

Alternative spellings or related surnames include Collin, Colling, Coling, Collings, Colings, Collis, Coliss, Collen, and Collens.
A great number of Welsh origin surnames share a similar etymology to English ones – where in English names the forename of the patriarch is suffixed with 'SON' (as in Peterson, Richardson, Johnson) in Welsh names the 'SON' is simply the letter "S" (Phillips, Davies, Davis, Williams) and Collins may have been one of the surnames to have originated in this way.

The Domesday Book (compiled in 1086) was the first to document names in England and Wales and at this time only the upper classes were literate. During the time between this and the first census of 1801 names continually changed due to the illiterate nature of the British population. Indeed, the need to be able to complete such documents may be a key factor in the change to fixed spellings.

The earliest documented evidence of the name in England dates back as far as the twelfth and thirteenth centuries where several instances have been recorded. One Colinus de Andresia appears in the pipe rolls of Berkshire in 1191, while a Colinus is mentioned in Hartopp's Register of the Freeman of Leicester recorded in 1196. The name Colinc is also mentioned several times in the Domesday Book. The personal name Colin from which the surname derives has an even older history; Ceawlin, the king of the West Saxons, Caelin, a brother of St Chad, and the early Welsh saint, Kollen, all have names related to Colin. In Ireland, Collins is a genuinely indigenous Irish name; in fact, it is one of the most numerous surnames, ranked number 30.

Collins (baseball) (first name unknown) (fl. 1892), American baseball player

A
Aaron Collins (1930–1997), American singer/songwriter
Aaron Collins (born 1997), Welsh footballer
A. E. J. Collins (1885–1914), English cricketer and army officer
Aidan Collins (born 1986), English footballer
Alan Collins (sculptor) (1928–2016), English-born sculptor
Alan Collins (writer) (1928–2008), Australian-Jewish author
Al and Albert Collins (disambiguation), multiple people, multiple people
Al "Jazzbo" Collins (1919–1997), American disc jockey, radio personality and recording artist
Albert Collins (politician) (1868–1956), New South Wales politician
Albert Collins (painter) (1883–1951), Australian painter, teacher and actor
Albert Collins (footballer) (1899–1969), English footballer
Albert Collins (1932–1993), American blues musician
Albin Collins (1927–2006), American National Football League player
Alex Collins (disambiguation), multiple people, multiple people
Alex Collins (politician) (1876–1949), mayor
Alex Collins (American football) (born 1994), American football player
Alexander L. Collins (1812–1901), American judge, lawyer, and politician
Alfred Collins (1915–2007), London's longest-serving taxi driver
Allan Collins (Australian rules footballer) (1919–2006)
Allan M. Collins, cognitive and education scientist
Allegra Collins (born 1972), American attorney, educator and judge
Allen Collins (1952–1990), American guitarist
Amelia Collins (1873–1962), prominent American Bahá'i
An Collins, 17th century English poet
Andrew and Andy Collins (disambiguation), multiple people, multiple people
Andrew Collins (judge) (born 1942), English barrister and judge
Andrew Collins (footballer, born 1965), former Australian rules player for Hawthorn
Andrew Collins (broadcaster) (born 1965), British journalist, scriptwriter and broadcaster
Andrew Collins (cricketer) (1972–1999), English cricketer
Andrew Collins (actor) (born 1973), British actor
Andrew Collins (footballer, born 1988), current Australian rules player for Carlton
Andy Collins (TV presenter) (born 1970), British television personality
Andy Collins (artist) (born 1971), American artist
Andy Collins (game designer), role-playing game developer and "Sage" for Wizards of the Coast
Ann, Anne and Annie Collins (disambiguation), multiple people, multiple people
Ann Collins (1916–1999), American painter
Anne Fraser née Collins (born 1951), New Zealand politician
Anne Collins (author) (born 1952), Canadian writer, editor and publishing executive
Anne Collins (contralto) (1943–2009), English opera singer
Annie Collins (born 19??), New Zealand film editor
Anthony Collins (American football) (born 1985), American football player
Anthony Collins (1676–1729), English philosopher
Anthony Collins (composer) (1893–1963), British film score composer and conductor
Anthony G. Collins (born 1949), Australian-American university president
Art and Arthur Collins (disambiguation), multiple people
Art Collins (basketball) (born 1954), retired American basketball player
Arthur Collins (antiquarian) (1682–1760), English genealogist and historian
Arthur Collins (politician) (1832–1921), New Zealand politician
Arthur Collins (courtier) (1845–1911), English equerry in the courts of Queen Victoria and King Edward VII
Arthur Collins (theatre manager) (1864–1932), manager of Drury Lane Theatre
Arthur Collins (singer) (1864–1933), American singer
Arthur L. Collins (1868–1902), British metallurgist, mining engineer and mine manager
Arthur Collins (cricketer) (1871–1945), English cricketer
Arthur Greville Collins (1896–1980), American film director
Arthur Collins (rugby union) (1906–1988), New Zealand rugby union player
Arthur A. Collins (1909–1987), founder of Collins Radio
Arthur D. Collins Jr. (born 1947), chairman of Medtronic
Arthur R. Collins (born 1960), American political consultant
Ashley Collins (born 1967), American artist
Audrey Collins (1915–2010), English cricketer and sports administrator
Audrey B. Collins (born 1945), American District Judge

B
Barbara-Rose Collins (1939–2021), American politician
Barrie Collins, writer on the Rwandan genocide
Becky Collins (born 1944), American swimmer
Ben and Benjamin Collins (disambiguation), multiple people, multiple people
Ben Collins (American football) ( – 2014), American football player and coach
Ben Collins (soccer) (born 1961), retired Liberian soccer midfielder
Ben Collins (racing driver) (born 1975), British racing driver
Ben Collins (programmer), Debian Project Leader from January 1999 to March 2001
Ben Collins, American screenwriter
Benjamin Collins (cricketer, born 1820) (1820–1903), English cricketer
Bernadette Collins, British strategy engineer from Northern Ireland
Bernie Collins (1935–2018), Canadian politician
Bianca Collins (born 1988), American actress
Bill and Billy Collins (disambiguation), multiple people, multiple people
Bill Collins (catcher) (1863–1893), American baseball player on Cleveland Spiders all-time roster
Bill Collins (outfielder) (1882–1962), American baseball outfielder
Bill Collins (American football player) (1901–1976), American football player
Bill Collins (footballer, born 1920) (1920–2010), aka Buster Collins, Northern Irish footballer
Bill Collins (racecaller) (1928–1997), Australian racecaller
Bill Collins (golfer) (1928–2006), American professional golfer
Bill Collins (television presenter) (1934–2019), Australian film critic and television presenter
Bill Collins (ice hockey) (born 1943), Canadian former ice hockey player
Bill Collins (athlete) (born 1950), Masters athletics world record sprinter
Billy Collins (Australian footballer) (1909–1987), Australian footballer for Melbourne
Billy Collins (born 1941), American poet
Bob and Bobby Collins (disambiguation), multiple people, multiple people
Bob Collins (footballer, born 1934), Australian rules footballer for Footscray
Bob Collins (broadcaster) (1942–2000), American broadcaster
Bob Collins (politician) (1946–2007), Australian politician
Bobby Collins (footballer) (1931–2014), Scottish footballer
Bobby Collins (American football coach) (1933–2021), former American football coach
Bobby Collins (comedian) (born 1951), American stand-up comedian and film actor
Bobby Collins (basketball) (born 1966), American college basketball coach
Bobby Collins (tight end) (born 1976), former tight end in the National Football League
Bootsy Collins (born 1951), American funk bassist, singer and songwriter
Brent Collins (1941–1988), American actor
Brian Collins (disambiguation), multiple people
Brian Collins (cricketer) (born 1941), former English cricketer
Brian Collins (speedway rider) (born 1948), Scottish former motorcycle speedway rider
Brian Collins (1970s singer) (born 1950), American country music artist
Brian Collins (2010s singer), American country music artist
 Brian Todd Collins (born 1986), American rapper known as Kid Ink
Brian Collins (designer), American designer and creative director
 Bridget Jean Collins, maiden name of American playwright Jean Kerr
Bud Collins (1929–2016), American journalist

C
Cal Collins (1933–2001), American jazz guitarist
Calvin Collins (born 1974), American football guard
Cardiss Collins (1931–2013), American politician
Careena Collins (born 1967), American porn actress and director
Carla Collins (born 1965), Canadian comedian, actress, TV host and writer
Carr Collins Sr. (1892–1980), American businessman and philanthropist
Catfish Collins (1943–2010), American guitarist, brother of Bootsy Collins
Cecil Collins (artist) (1908–1989), British artist
Cecil L. Collins (1926–2007), American politician
Cecil Collins (football) (born 1976), American footballer and convicted burglar
Charles and Charlie Collins (disambiguation), multiple people, multiple people
Charles Collins (painter) ( – 1744), Irish painter
Charles James Collins (1820–1864), English journalist and novelist
Charles Allston Collins (1828–1873), British Pre-Raphaelite artist
Charles Collins (New South Wales politician) (1850–1898), New South Wales politician
Charles Collins (ice hockey) (1882–1920), Canadian ice hockey player
Charles Collins (actor) (1904–1999), American actor
Charles E. Collins (politician) (1929–2012), independent candidate for president of the United States in 1996 and 2000
Charles E. Collins (American football), American football coach
Charlie Collins (politician) (born 1962), Arkansas politician
Charlie Collins (footballer) (born 1991), English footballer
Chris Collins (disambiguation), multiple people
 Chris Collins (New York politician) (born 1950), former U.S. Representative for New York's 27th congressional district
 Chris Collins (Virginia politician) (born 1971), member of the Virginia House of Delegates
Chris Collins (soccer) (born 1956), American soccer player
Chris Collins (Canadian politician) (born 1962), Canadian politician from New Brunswick
Chris Collins (musician) (born 1967), American musician, recording engineer/producer and technologist
Chris Collins (basketball) (born 1974), American basketball player and coach, son of Doug Collins
Chris Collins (lacrosse) (born 1982), American lacrosse player
Chris Collins (ice hockey) (born 1984), American ice hockey player
Chris Collins (singer), American musician and former vocalist for the band now known as Dream Theater
Chris Collins (writer), American television writer
Christine Collins (rower) (born 1969), American rower
Christopher Collins (disambiguation), multiple people
Christopher Collins (cricketer) (1859–1919), English cricketer
Christopher Collins (1949–1994), American actor, voice artist and comedian also known as Chris Latta
 Christopher Graham Collins (born 1957), birth name of the British comedian Frank Skinner
Chuck Collins (American football) (1903–1977), American football player and coach
Chuck Collins (born 1959), American author on economic matters
Clara Stone Fields Collins (1908–1981), Alabama legislator
 Clarence Collins (born 1942), American musician, vocalist. Founder of R&B vocal group Little Anthony and the Imperials
Clifton Collins Jr. (born 1970), American actor
Coi Leray Collins (born 1997), birth name of American rapper and singer Coi Leray
Colm Collins, Gaelic football manager
Con Collins (1881–1937), Irish politician

D
Dal Collins (1907–2001), South African cricket umpire
Damian Collins (born 1974), British Conservative Party politician
Dan, Daniel, Danielle and Danny Collins (disambiguation), multiple people, multiple people
Dan Collins (baseball) (1854–1883), baseball player
Dan Collins (journalist), senior producer for CBS News.com
Daniel Collins (priest) (died 1648) Canon of Windsor
Daniel Collins (canoeist) (born 1970), Australian Olympic canoeist
Danielle Collins (born 1993), American tennis player
Danny Collins (footballer) (born 1980), Welsh footballer
Danny Boy Collins (born 1967), English wrestler
Darnell Collins (1961–1995), American spree killer
Darren Collins (disambiguation), multiple people
Darren Collins (Australian footballer) (born 1967), Australian rules footballer
Darren Collins (English footballer) (born 1967), English footballer
Darren Collins (athlete), Australian Paralympic athlete
Darron Collins (born 1970), American human ecologist
Daryl Collins (born 1956), Australian rules footballer
David Collins (disambiguation), multiple people
Dave Collins (born 1952), American baseball player
David Collins (lieutenant governor) (1754–1810), first Lieutenant Governor of Van Diemens Land (later Tasmania)
David Collins (New Zealand cricketer) (1887–1967), played for Wellington and Cambridge University
David Collins (judge) (born 1954), Justice of the High Court of New Zealand
David Collins (interior designer) (1955–2013), designer of interiors of bars and restaurants in London
David Collins (rower) (born 1969), American rower
David Collins (hurler) (born 1984), Irish hurler
Dean Collins (dancer) (1917–1984), American dancer
Dean Collins (actor) (born 1990), American actor
Derek Collins (born 1969), Scottish footballer
Derek Collins (born 1970), Irish Tenor and Poet
Des Collins (1923–2017), English footballer
Desmond H. Collins, Canadian paleontologist
Diana Collins (1917–2003), English social activist
Dobson Collins (born 1987), American and Canadian football player from Georgia, USA
Dolly Collins (1933–1995), British folk singer
Dominic Collins (1566–1602), Irish Jesuit lay brother, soldier and Roman Catholic martyr
Dominic Collins (swimmer) (born 1977), Australian Paralympic swimmer
Don Collins (disambiguation), multiple people
Don Collins (baseball) (1952–2022), American baseball player
Don Collins (born 1958), American basketball player
 Don Collins, alleged rapist and murderer of Robbie Middleton
Donal Collins (19??–2010), Irish priest and teacher convicted of sexual abuse of pupils in his charge
Donald Collins (Maine politician) (1925–2018), American politician in Maine
Donald Collins (Vermont politician) (born 1942), American politician in Vermont
Dorothy Collins (1926–1994), American actress and recording artist (born Marjorie Chandler)
Dottie Wiltse Collins (1923–2008), American professional baseball player
Doug Collins (disambiguation), multiple people
Doug Collins (journalist) (1920–2001), Canadian journalist, alleged Holocaust denier
Doug Collins (footballer) (born 1945), English footballer
Doug Collins (Canadian football) (born 1948), Canadian football player
Doug Collins (basketball) (born 1951), NBA player, current coach
Doug Collins (politician) (born 1966), American politician

E
Eamon Collins (1954–1999), IRA paramilitary and author
Eamonn Collins (footballer) (born 1965), Irish footballer
Earl Collins (1895–1958), Canadian politician
Eddie, Edmund, Edward and Edwyn Collins (disambiguation)
Eddie Collins (actor) (1883–1940), American comedian, actor and singer
Eddie Collins (1887–1951), American baseball player and manager
Eddie Collins Jr. (1916–2000), American baseball player
 Eddie Collins (born 1981), American rapper known as Greydon Square
Edmund John Patrick Collins (1931–2014), Australian Roman Catholic bishop
Edward Knight Collins (1802–1878), American shipping magnate
Edward Treacher Collins (1862–1932), British surgeon and ophthalmologist
Edward Joseph Collins (1886–1951), American composer and pianist
Edward Collins (figure skater) (fl. 1957–1959) Canadian
Edward Collins (Irish politician) (1941–2019), Irish Fine Gael politician
Edward J. Collins Jr. ( – 2007), Massachusetts civil servant and public manager
Edwyn Collins, Scottish musician
Eileen Collins (born 1956), American astronaut, first female Space Shuttle pilot (STS-63) and commander (STS-93)
Elisabeth Collins (1904–2000), British artist
Elizabeth Collins (born 1982), Canadian swimmer
Emily Parmely Collins (1814–1909), American suffragist, activist, writer
Eoin Collins (born 1968), Irish tennis player
 Eric Dwayne Collins (born 1968), American rapper known as RBX
Eric Collins (born 1969), American sports announcer

F
Felicia Collins (born 1964), American musician
Florestine Perrault Collins (1895–1988), American photographer
Floyd Collins (1887–1925), American cave explorer
Francis Dolan Collins (1841–1891), American politician
Francis Collins (born 1950), American geneticist
Frank Collins (disambiguation), multiple people, several people
Frank Collins (footballer) (1893–19??), Irish footballer
Frank Collins (musician) (born 1947), British composer, singer and arranger
Frank Collins (British Army soldier) (1956–1998), SAS Soldier and Church of England Minister

G
G. Pat Collins (1895–1959), American actor
Gail Collins (born 1945), American journalist and author
Gary Collins (disambiguation), multiple people, multiple people
Gary Collins (ice hockey) (1935–2022), Canadian player for the Toronto Maple Leafs
Gary Collins (actor) (1938–2012), American film and television actor
Gary Collins (American football) (born 1940), American football end and punter for the Cleveland Browns
Gary Collins (Idaho politician) (born 1942), Republican Idaho State Representative
Gary Collins (racing driver) (born 1960), American stock car driver
Gary Collins (Canadian politician) (born 1963), Canadian politician
Gavin Collins, British Anglican bishop
Gavin Collins (baseball), American baseball player
Gemma Collins (born 1981), English media personality and businesswoman
Geoff and Geoffrey Collins (disambiguation), multiple people, multiple people
Geoff Collins (1926–2005), Australian rules footballer
Geoffrey Collins (cricketer, born 1909) (1909–1968), English cricketer
Geoffrey Collins (cricketer, born 1918) (1918–2008), English cricketer
George Collins (disambiguation), multiple people, multiple people
George Collins (Nova Scotia politician) (1771–1813), mariner, merchant and political figure in Nova Scotia
George Collins (Australian politician) (1839–1926), Tasmanian politician
George Collins (cricketer, born 1889) (1889–1949), English cricketer
George R. Collins (1917–1993), American historian
George W. Collins (1925–1972), U.S. Representative from Illinois
George E. Collins (1928–2017), American mathematician
George Collins (footballer), English football manager
Gerard Collins (canoeist) (born 1952), Irish slalom canoeist
Gerry Collins (disambiguation), multiple people
Gerry Collins (politician) (born 1938), Irish Fianna Fáil politician
Gerry Collins (footballer) (born 1955), Scottish footballer and coach
Gerry Collins (broadcaster), Australian broadcaster
Glen Collins (American football) (born 1959), American football player
Glen Collins (footballer) (born 1977), New Zealand association football player
Glenda Collins (born 1943), British pop singer
Godfrey Collins (1875–1936), British politician
Goldie Collins (1901–1982), Australian rules footballer
Gordon Collins (1914–1986), English cricketer
Grant Collins (born 19??), Australian drummer
Gregor Collins (born 1976), American writer, actor, and producer
Guy N. Collins (1872–1938), American botanist and geneticist

H
Hal Collins, American football coach
Harlan Collins (born 19??), American composer
Harold and Harry Collins (disambiguation), multiple people, multiple people
Harold Collins (Australian politician) (1887–1962), Australian politician in Queensland
Harold Collins (strongman), (born 1957), American strongman and powerlifter
Harry Collins (footballer) (1892–1918), Australian rules footballer
Harry J. Collins (1895–1963), US Army general
 Harry Warren Collins (1896–1968), American baseball pitcher known as Rip Collins
Harry Collins (born 1943), British academic
Heidi Collins (born 1967), American news broadcaster
Henry Collins (disambiguation), multiple people, multiple people
Henry Collins (politician) (1844–1904), Canadian mayor of Vancouver
Henry Collins (official) (1905–1961), U.S. government employee and Soviet spy
Henry Collins (boxer) (born 1977), Australian boxer
 Herbert and Herbie Collins, multiple people
Herbert A. Collins (1865–1937), Canadian-born American landscape and portrait painter
Herbert Collins (1885–1975), British architect
Herbie Collins (1888–1959), Australian cricketer
Hercules Collins (died 1702), English Baptist minister and author
Hub Collins (1864–1892), American baseball player
Hubert Collins (born 1936), American politician in Kentucky
Hugh Collins (born 1953), British legal academic

I
Ian Collins (disambiguation), multiple people, one of several people including:
Ian Collins (tennis) (1903–1975), British tennis player from the 1920s and 1930s
Ian Collins (footballer) (born 1942), Australian businessman and former Australian rules footballer
Ian Collins (radio presenter) (born 1956), UK radio presenter
Ian Collins (soccer) (born 1963), American soccer coach at the University of Kentucky
Isaac Collins (printer) (1746–1817), American colonial printer, publisher, bookseller and merchant
Isaac J. Collins (1874–1975), American businessman, founder of the Anchor Hocking

J
Jacinta Collins (born 1962), Australian politician
Jack Collins (disambiguation), multiple people, one of several people including:
Jack Collins (footballer, born 1904) (1904–1968), Australian rules footballer for Melbourne
Jack Collins (footballer, born 1910) (1910–1972), Australian rules footballer for Geelong
Jack Collins (actor) (1918–2005), American stage actor
Jack Collins (footballer, born 1925) (1925–1998), Australian rules footballer for Fitzroy and Essendon
Jack Collins (footballer, born 1930) (1930–2008), Australian rules footballer for Footscray and football administrator
Jack Collins (umpire) (1932–2021), Australian Test cricket umpire
Jack Collins (politician) (born 1943), American college basketball coach and politician in New Jersey
Jackie Collins (1937–2015), British novelist
Jacqueline Y. Collins (born 1949), American politician
Jalen Collins (born 1993), American football player
James Collins (disambiguation), multiple people, one of several people including:
James Collins (public servant) (1869–1934), Australian Secretary of the Department of the Treasury
James Lawton Collins (1882–1963), U.S. Army general
James L. Collins (1883–1953), Texas oil man and community philanthropist
James Collins (Irish politician) (1900–1967), Irish politician and father of Gerard Collins
James Francis Collins (1905–1989), U.S. Army general
James M. Collins (1916–1989), American politician
James Franklin Collins (born 1939), U.S. diplomat and Ambassador to Russia
James C. Collins (born 1958), American business theorist
James Collins (bioengineer) (born 1965), American bioengineer
James Collins (basketball) (born 1973), American basketball player
James Collins (footballer) (born 1983), Welsh footballer playing for West Ham
James Collins (rugby union) (born 1986), English rugby union player
James Collins (footballer, born 1990), Irish footballer (Shrewsbury Town, Swindon Town, Hibernian)
James Collins (songwriter), Canadian songwriter, actor and singer
Jamie Collins (disambiguation), multiple people, one of several people including:
Jamie Collins (footballer born 1978), English footballer
Jamie Collins (footballer born 1984), English footballer
Jamie Collins (American football) (born 1989), American football player
Jane Collins (born 1962), British Ukip Member of the European Parliament
Jarron Collins (born 1978), American basketball player and coach
Jason Collins (surfer) (born 1974), American surfer
Jason Collins (born 1978), American basketball player
Javiar Collins (born 1978), American football player
Jed Collins (born 1986), American football player
Jennie Collins (1828–1887), labor reformer, humanitarian, and suffragist
Jerry Collins (1980–2015), Samoan-born New Zealand rugby player
Jess Collins (1923–2004), American artist
Jessica Collins (born 1971), American actress
Jessie Collins (born 1983), American actress
Jim Collins (curler), (—1982), Canadian curler
Jim Collins (footballer, born 1923) (1923–1996), footballer for Barrow and Chester City
Jim Collins (ice hockey) (born 1951), Canadian ice hockey player
Jim Collins (linebacker) (born 1958), American football linebacker and NFL Pro Bowler
Jim Collins (singer) (born 1959), American country music singer-songwriter
Jim Collins (American football coach) (born 1966), head football coach at Saginaw Valley State University
Jimmy Collins (1870–1943), American baseball player
Jimmy Collins (footballer, born 1903) (1903–1977), English footballer who played for West Ham United
Jimmy Collins (footballer, born 1911) (1911–1983), English footballer
Jimmy Collins (footballer, born 1923), Irish goalkeeper during the 1940s and 1950s
Jimmy Collins (footballer, born 1937), Scottish footballer
Jimmy Collins (basketball) (1946–2020), American basketball player and coach
J. Lawton Collins (1896–1987), American general and army Chief of Staff
Jo Collins (born 1945), American model
Joan Collins (born 1933), British actress
Joe Collins (American football), American football player for the University of Notre Dame, 1908–1909
Joe Collins (1922–1989), American baseball player
Joely Collins (born 1972), Canadian actress and producer
John Collins (disambiguation), multiple people, one of several people including:
John Collins (Andover MP) (1624–1711), English academic and politician
John Collins (mathematician) (1625–1683), English mathematician
John Collins (Independent minister) ( – 1687)
John Collins (delegate) (1717–1795), Rhode Island delegate to Continental Congress
John Collins (poet) (1742–1808), English orator, singer, and poet
John Baptist Collins (died 1794), would-be French pirate
John Collins (governor), (1776–1822), American manufacturer and Governor of Delaware
John Collins Covell (1823–1887), American educator and school administrator
John S. Collins (1837–1928), American Quaker farmer who moved to southern Florida
John Churton Collins (1848–1908), English literary critic
John J. Collins (bishop) (1856–1934), American-born Catholic bishop in Jamaica
John Collins (New Zealand cricketer) (1868–1943)
John Collins (Fijian cricketer) (fl. 1895), Fijian cricketer
John F. Collins (1872–1962), Mayor of Providence, Rhode Island, 1939–1941
John Collins (VC) (1880–1951), English soldier awarded the Victoria Cross
John Augustine Collins (1899–1989), Royal Australian Navy
John H. Collins (academic) (1902–1981), American classical scholar
John Collins (priest), (1905–1982), UK radical Anglican cleric
John W. Collins (1912–2001), chess instructor
John Collins (jazz guitarist) (1913–2001), American
John F. Collins (1919–1995), Mayor of Boston, Massachusetts (1960–1968)
John A. Collins (chaplain) (1931–2003), Chief of Chaplains of the U.S. Air Force
John Collins (UK businessman) (born 1941), former head of National Power
John D. Collins (born 1942), British actor, best known for his role in 'Allo 'Allo
John Collins (footballer, born 1942), former English professional footballer
John Joseph Collins (born 1944), Irish barrister
John J. Collins (born 1946), Irish biblical studies scholar
John C. Collins (born 1949), American theoretical particle physicist
John Collins (footballer, born 1949), former Welsh professional footballer
John Collins (sports executive) (born 1961), American sports executive
John Collins (footballer born 1968), Scottish football player and manager
John Collins (theater) (born c. 1969), American experimental theater director
John Collins (Australian musician) (born 1971), Australian bass player for Powderfinger
John Collins (Canadian musician) (born 19??), of The New Pornographers and The Smugglers
John Collins (musician/researcher) (born 19??), British
Johnny Collins (1938–2009), British folk singer
Johnson Collins  (1847–1906), African-American politician
Jon Collins (born 1960s), American basketball player
Jonathan Collins (born 1961), Australian rules footballer
Jose Collins (1887–1958), English actress and singer
Joseph Collins (disambiguation), multiple people, multiple people
Joseph Henry Collins (1841–1916), mining engineer and geologist
Joseph Collins (1866–1950), American neurologist
Joseph Lawton Collins (1896–1987), American soldier
Joseph T. Collins (1939–2012), American herpetologist
Joyce Collins (1930–2010), American jazz pianist and singer
Judith Collins (born 1959), New Zealand politician
Judson Dwight Collins (1823–1852), Methodist missionary to China
Judy Collins (born 1939), American singer and songwriter
Julia C. Collins (c. 1842 – 65), African-American writer
Julia Collins (Jeopardy! contestant) (born 1982), contestant on the American game show Jeopardy!
Julie Collins (born 1971), Australian politician
Justin Lee Collins (born 1974), British comedian

K
Karl Collins (born 1971), English actor
Kate and Katherine Collins (disambiguation), multiple people, multiple people
Kate Collins (actress) (born 1959), American actress
Kate Collins (journalist) (born 1983), South Australian television presenter
Kate Collins (author), American author
Katherine Collins (born 1947), Canadian cartoonist and writer
Ken Collins (born 1939), Scottish MEP and environmentalist
Keri Collins (born 1978), Welsh director and writer for film and TV
Kerry Collins, American football quarterback in the National Football League
Kevin Collins (disambiguation), multiple people
Kevin Collins (baseball) (1946–2016), American Major League Baseball player
Kevin Collins (ice hockey) (born 1950), retired National Hockey League linesman
Kevin J. Collins (born 1970), American political consultant
Kevin Collins (American actor) (born 1972), American actor in theatre, film, television and radio drama
Kevin Andrew Collins (born 1974), child abducted from San Francisco in 1984
Kim Collins (born 1976), runner from St Kitts and Nevis
Kip Collins (1969–2006), American record producer and composer
Kreigh Collins (tennis) (1875–1909), American tennis player

L
Landon Collins (born 1994), American football safety
Larry Collins (writer) (1929–2005), American writer
Lauren Collins (born 1986), Canadian actress
Lawrence Collins, Baron Collins of Mapesbury (born 1941), British judge
J. Lawton Collins (1896–1987), American General and Army Chief of Staff
Lee Collins (disambiguation), multiple people, one of several people
Lee Collins (musician) (1901–1960), American jazz musician
Lee Collins (Scottish footballer) (born 1974), midfielder
Lee Collins (footballer born 1977), English non-league defender
Lee Collins (footballer) (1988–2021), English defender
Lee Collins (Unicode), one of the creators of Unicode
Leigh Collins (1901–1975), English footballer
Leon Collins (1922–1985), American dancer
LeRoy Collins (1909–1991), American politician: 33rd Governor of Florida
Les Collins (born 1958), British speedway rider
Lester Collins (landscape architect) (1914–1993), American landscape architect
Lewis Collins (disambiguation), multiple people, multiple people
Lewis Collins (RAF officer) (1894–1971), British World War I flying ace
Lewis Preston Collins II (1896–1952), Lieutenant Governor of Virginia
Lewis D. Collins (1899–1954), American film director
Lewis Collins (1946–2013), British actor
Lily Collins (born 1989), British-American actress, model, and television personality
Linda Collins-Smith (1962–2019), American politician
Linton McGee Collins (1902–1972), American judge
Lisa Collins (actress) (born 1968), Australian actress
Lorence G. Collins (born 1931), American petrologist
Loren W. Collins (1838–1912), American jurist and politician
Lorenzo D. Collins (1821–1898), New York politician
Lorenzo Collins ( – 1997), American shot dead by police in Cincinnati
Lorrie Collins (1942–2018), American country, rockabilly and rock 'n' roll singer
Lottie Collins (1865–1910), English singer and dancer
Louis L. Collins (1882–1950) 23rd Lieutenant Governor of Minnesota
Lucinda Collins, Australian pianist
Lui Collins (born 1950), American folk singer
Lyn Collins (1948–2005), American singer

M
Mabel Collins (1851–1927), writer on theosophy
Mac Collins (1944–2018), American politician
Maggie Collins, Australian band manager and radio announcer
Malcolm Collins (born 1935), Welsh amateur boxer
Manny Collins (born 1984), American footballer
Marco Collins (born 1965), American radio personality
Marcus Collins (disambiguation), multiple people, one of several people including:
Marcus Evelyn Collins (1861–1944), British architect
Marcus Collins (singer) (born 1988), British singer, contestant in UK's The X Factor
Marcus Collins (entertainer), American actor and singer
Mardy Collins, American basketball player
María Antonieta Collins (born 1952), Mexican journalist
Marilyn Collins, British sculptor
Mark Collins (disambiguation), multiple people, one of several people including:
Mark Collins (American football) (born 1964), American football player
Mark Collins (musician) (born 1965), English musician (The Charlatans)
Mark Collins (Director of the Commonwealth Foundation) (born 1952), English
Martha Layne Collins (born 1936), Democratic Governor of Kentucky from 1983 to 1987
Martha Collins (poet) (born 1940), American poet
Martin Collins, British radio broadcaster
Marva Collins (1936–2015), American teacher
Mary Collins (disambiguation), multiple people, one of several people including:
Mary Collins (missionary) (1846–1920), American who worked among the Sioux
Mary Call Darby Collins (1911–2009), First Lady of Florida from 1955 to 1961
Mary Collins (politician) (born 1940), Canadian politician
 Mary Cathleen Collins (born 1956), American actress known as Bo Derek
Matthew Collins (disambiguation), multiple people, one of several people including:
Matthew Collins (Australian footballer) (born 1977) from Victoria
Matthew Collins (Welsh footballer) (born 1986), Welsh footballer
Matthew Collins (academic), professor of biomedical archaeology at York University
Maude Collins, sheriff in Ohio
Maurice Collins, one of several people including:
Maurice Collins (politician) (1878–1945), Australian politician
Maurice Collins (judge), Irish judge
Max Collins (disambiguation), multiple people, one of several people including:
Max Allan Collins (born 1948), American mystery writer
Max Collins (musician) (born 1978), American musician
Max Collins (actress) (born 1992), Filipino American actress and model
May Collins (1903–1955), American actress
Mel Collins (born 1947), British musician
Melissa Collins (born 1976), Canadian water polo player
Michael Collins (disambiguation), multiple people, one of several people including:
Michael Collins (bishop) (1771–1832), Roman Catholic Bishop of Cloyne and Ross
Michael F. Collins (1854–1928), American newspaper publisher and politician
Michael Collins (Irish leader) (1890–1922), Irish Republican leader
Michael Collins (American author), pseudonym of American author Dennis Lynds (1924–2005)
Michael Collins (astronaut) (1930–2021), American astronaut, a member of the historic Apollo 11 crew
Michael Collins (Limerick politician) (1940–2022), contemporary Irish politician
Michael Collins (hurler) (1941–2009), Irish hurler
D. Michael Collins (1944–2015), Mayor of Toledo, Ohio, from 2014 to 2015
Michael Collins (soccer) (born 1961), American professional soccer midfielder
Michael Collins (writer and broadcaster) (born 1961), British author, journalist and television presenter
Michael Collins (Irish author) (born 1964)
Michael Collins (computational linguist) (born 1971), British-born researcher in computer science
Michael Collins (footballer born 1977), retired footballer
Michael Collins (baseball) (born 1984), Australian baseball player
Michael Collins (footballer, born 1986), Irish and Oxford United professional footballer
Michael Collins (rugby union, born 1986) (born 1986), Welsh rugby union player
Michael Collins (New Zealand rugby player) (born 1993), rugby union player
Michael Collins (Dublin politician), Lord Mayor of Dublin 1977–1978
Michael P. Collins, Canadian structural engineer
Michelle Collins (born 1962), British actress
Michelle Collins (athlete) (born 1971), American sprinter
Michelle Collins (comedian) (born 1981), comedian
Mick and Mike Collins (disambiguation), multiple people, one of several people including:
Mick Collins (born 1965), American musician
Mike Collins (Australian footballer born 1939), former 1960s VFL footballer
Mike Collins (Australian footballer born 1953), former 1970s VFL footballer
Mike Collins (American football) (born 1960), head football coach at the University of Louisiana
Mike Collins (comics) (born 1961), British-born American comic book artist
Mike Collins (ice hockey) (born 1990), American ice hockey player
Misha Collins (born 1974), American actor
Mo Collins (born 1965), a comedian from the Fox television variety show MADtv
Mo Collins (1976–2014), American football player
Mortimer Collins (1827–1876), British novelist
Muirhead Collins (1852–1927), English-born Royal Navy officer and Australian diplomat

N
Nancy Adams Collins (born 1947), politician in Mississippi
Nancy A. Collins (born 1959), American writer
Nancy W. Collins (born 1973), professor at Columbia University
Napoleon Collins (1814–1875), American naval officer
Nathaniel Collins (born 1996), Scottish boxer
Natasha Collins (1976–2008), English actress and model
Nate Collins (born 1987), American football defensive tackle
Neil and Neill Collins (disambiguation), multiple people, multiple people
Neil Collins (speedway rider) (born 1961), English former speedway rider
Neil Collins (broadcaster), New Zealand broadcaster and local body politician
Neill Collins (born 1983), Scottish footballer
Newton Collins (1819–1903), American businessman
Nick Collins (English footballer) (1911–1990), English Association footballer
Nick Collins (born 1983), American football player
Nick Collins (composer) (born 1975), British composer
Nick Collins (politician), American politician in Massachusetts
Nico Collins (born 1999), American football player
Nicolas Collins (born 1954), American composer
Nicole Collins, Canadian artist
Nigel Collins (disambiguation), multiple people
Noel Collins (1936–2011), British actor
Norm Collins (1904–1933), Australian rules footballer from Victoria
Norman Collins (1907–1982), British writer and broadcasting executive

O
Otis G. Collins (1917–1992), American businessman and politician

P
Paddy Collins (1903–1995), Irish hurler
Pat, Patricia and Patrick Collins (disambiguation), multiple people, one of several people including:
Pat Collins (showman) (1859–1943), British politician and fairground industry member
Pat Collins (baseball) (1896–1960), American baseball catcher
Pat Collins (American football) (born 1941), American football coach
Pat Collins (lighting designer), American
Pat Collins (film critic) American reporter for WWOR-TV
Patricia Hill Collins (born 1948), American sociologist and author
Patrick Collins (mayor) (1844–1905), Irish-born American politician
Patrick Collins (painter) (1911–1994), Irish painter
Patrick M. Collins (born 1964), American lawyer
Patrick Collins (American football) (born 1966), American football player
Patrick K. Collins (born 1977) rugby union Coach
Patrick Collins (footballer) (born 1985), player from England
Patrick Collins (director), American pornographic film producer and director
Paul Collins (disambiguation), multiple people, one of several people including:
Paul Collins (end) (1907–1988), American football player
Paul Collins (athlete) (1926–1995), Canadian long-distance runner
Paul Collins (artist) (born 1936), American realist painter
Paul Collins (actor) (born 1937), English actor
Paul Collins (Australian religious writer) (born 1940), Australian historian, broadcaster and writer
Paul Collins (fantasy writer) (born 1954), Australian writer
Paul Collins (musician) (born 1956), American drummer
Paul Collins (rugby union) (born 1959), Irish international rugby union footballer
Paul Collins (English footballer) (born 1966), English association football player
Paul Collins (American writer) (born 1969), American writer
Pauline Collins (born 1940), British actress
Pedro Collins, West Indian cricketer from Barbados
Perry Collins (1815–1900), American explorer and entrepreneur
Peter Collins (disambiguation), multiple people, one of several people including:
Peter Collins (racing driver) (1931–1958), British racing driver
Peter Collins (academic) (born 1945), British academic
Peter Collins (New South Wales politician) (born 1947), Leader of the Opposition of New South Wales, 1995–1998
Peter Collins (footballer) (born 1948), English footballer
Peter Collins (record producer) (born 1951), English record producer
Peter Collins (speedway rider) (born 1954), English speedway rider
Peter B. Collins (born ), American broadcaster
Peter Collins (broadcaster), Irish sportscaster
Peter Collins (organ builder), English pipe organ builder
Petra Collins (born 1992), Canadian photographer and fashion designer
Phil and Philip Collins (disambiguation), multiple people, one of several people including:
Phil Collins (baseball) (1901–1948), Major League pitcher
Phil Collins (born 1951), English drummer, singer, songwriter, record producer and actor. 
Phil Collins (speedway rider) (born 1960), international motorcycle racer
Phil Collins (artist) (born 1970), UK photographic and video award nominee
Philip Collins (journalist) (born 1967), British journalist
Porter Collins (born 1975), American rower

Q

R
 Rachel Collins (born 1976), American wrestler known as MsChif
Ralph Collins (1924–2007), Scottish footballer and manager
Randall Collins (born 1941), American sociologist
Randy Collins (born 19??), Canadian politician and fraudster
Ray and Raymond Collins (disambiguation), multiple people, one of several people including:
Ray Collins (baseball) (1887–1970), American baseball player
Ray Collins (actor) (1889–1965), actor
Ray Collins (American football) (1927–1991), American football defensive tackle
Ray Collins (rock musician) (1936–2012)
Ray Collins, Baron Collins of Highbury (born ), British trade unionist
Raymond J. Collins (1897–1965), New Zealand philatelist
Raymond Collins (priest) (born 1935), priest
Richard and Richie Collins (disambiguation), multiple people, one of several people including:
Richard Collins (artist) (1755–1831), British miniature portrait painter
Richard Collins, Baron Collins (1842–1911), British law lord
Richard Collins (bishop) (1857–1924), British Roman Catholic bishop of Hexham and Newcastle
Richard J. Collins (1914–2013), American screenwriter and producer
Richard L. Collins (1933–2018), aviation writer
Richard A. Collins (born 1966), British scientist and author
Richie Collins (born 1962), Welsh rugby union international and coach
Rip Collins (pitcher) (1896–1968), American Major League Baseball player
Rip Collins (catcher) (1909–1969), American Major League Baseball backup catcher
Ripper Collins (baseball) (1904–1970), American baseball player
Ripper Collins (wrestler) (1933-1991), American professional wrestler
Rob and Robert Collins (disambiguation), multiple people, one of several people including:
Rob Collins (musician) (1963–1996), English musician
Rob Collins (ice hockey) (born 1978), Canadian ice hockey player
Rob Collins (actor) (born 1979), Australian actor
Robert Martin Collins (1843–1913), Queensland politician and grazier
Robert A. Collins (1924–2003), American politician
Robert Frederick Collins (born 1931), U.S. federal judge
Roberta Collins (1944–2008), American actress
Robin Collins (born 19??), American philosopher
Roddy Collins (born 1961), Irish football player and manager
Roger Collins (born 1949), English medievalist
Ronald Collins (disambiguation), multiple people, one of several people including:
Ronald K. L. Collins (born 1949), American scholar and lawyer
Ronald F. Collins (born 19??), American politician in Maine
 Ronald W. Collins (born 1949), American scientist, businessman, historian, genealogist and author
Roosevelt Collins (born 1968), American football player
Rory Collins (born 19??), British epidemiologist
Rose Collins (born 19??), Irish camogie player
Ross A. Collins (1880–1968), American Congressman from Mississippi
Roy Collins (1934–2009), English cricketer
Rubin Collins (born 1953), American basketball player
Rudy Collins (1934–1988), American jazz drummer
Russell Collins (1897–1965), American actor

S
Sam, Sammy and Samuel Collins (disambiguation), multiple people, one of several people
Sam Collins (musician) (1887–1949), American blues singer and guitarist
Sam L. Collins (1895–1965), American politician
Sam Collins (Australian footballer) (born 1994), Australian rules footballer for Fremantle
Sam Collins (English footballer) (born 1977), English footballer
Sammy Collins (1923–1998), English footballer
Samuel Collins (theologian) (1576–1651), English clergyman and academic
Samuel Collins (physician) (1619–1670), British doctor
Samuel Collins (artist) (1735–1768), British artist
Samuel W. Collins (1802–1870), American axe manufacturer
Samuel Collins (physicist) (1898–1984), physicist at MIT
Sandra Collins (born 19??), American DJ
Sandy Collins (tennis) (born 1958), American tennis player
Sandy Collins (politician) (born 1978), member of the Newfoundland and Labrador House of Assembly
Sara Collins, British novelist winning award in 2019
Sarah Collins, American woman who enlisted in the Unionist army in the American Civil War
Sean Collins (disambiguation), multiple people
Seán Collins (politician) (1918–1975), Irish Fine Gael politician from Cork, TD 1948–1957 and 1961–1969
Sean Collins (surf forecaster) (1952–2011), founder of Surfline
Sean Collins (ice hockey defenceman) (born 1983), American ice hockey defenceman
Sean Collins (ice hockey forward b. 1983), American minor pro ice hockey forward
Sean Collins (ice hockey b. 1988), Canadian ice hockey player drafted by the Columbus Blue Jackets
Seth Collins (born 1996), American football player
Seward Collins (1899–1952), American publisher and self-declared fascist
Shane Collins (disambiguation), multiple people, one of several people
Shane Collins (field hockey) (born 1963), field hockey player from New Zealand
Shane Collins (American football) (born 1969), American football defensive end
Shano Collins (1885–1955), American baseball player
Shawn Collins (born 1967), American football player
Sherron Collins (born 1987), American basketball player
Shirley Collins (born 1935), British folk singer
Shirley Collins (politician) (born 1952), Canadian politician
Sid Collins (1922–1977), American broadcaster
Simon Collins (footballer) (born 1973), English football player and manager
Simon Collins (born 1976), Canadian musician
Sonny Collins (born 1953), American football running back
Stanley Collins (1909–1993), South African cricket umpire
Stef Collins (born 1982), British international basketball player
Stephen, Steve and Steven Collins (disambiguation), multiple people, multiple people
Stephen Collins (politician) (1847–1925), British Liberal politician, MP for Kennington
Stephen Collins (born 1947), American actor
Stephen Collins (speedway rider) (born 1966), English motorcyclist
Stephen Collins (journalist) (born 19??), Irish journalist
Steven Collins (archaeologist) Albuquerque, New Mexico.
Steve Collins (baseball) (born 1918), minor league player-manager
Steve Collins (footballer) (born 1962), defender with Peterborough United and Southend
Steve Collins (born 1964), Irish boxer
Steve Collins (ski jumper) (born 1964), from Canada
Steve Collins (American football) (born 1970), Oklahoma Sooners quarterback
Steven Collins (born 19??), lecturer in the Department of Computer Science in Trinity College, Dublin
Stuart Collins (born 19??), Australian rugby league footballer
Susan Collins (born 1952), American politician
Susan Collins (artist) (born 1964), English artist and academic
Suzanne Collins (disambiguation), multiple people, multiple people
Suzanne Collins (born 1962), American writer (The Hunger Games)
Suzanne Collins (actress) (born 1978), English actress
Suzanne Marie Collins (1966–1985), American Marine Corps Lance Corporal and murder victim

T
Tai Collins (born 1962), American model, actress and screenwriter
Tank Collins (born 1969), American basketball player
Ted Collins (disambiguation), multiple people, multiple people
Ted Collins (Australian footballer) (1893–1974), Australian rules footballer for St Kilda
Ted Collins (Canadian football) (born ), Canadian footballer
Ted Collins (manager) (1900–1964), Show-biz manager and owner of American football team franchises
Terry Collins (born 1949), American baseball manager
Tess Collins (born 19??), American novelist and theatre manager
Thomas Collins (disambiguation), multiple people, one of several people including:
Thomas Collins (governor) (1732–1789), American lawyer and Governor of Delaware
Thomas Collins (UK politician) (died 1884), Member of Parliament for Knaresborough and Boston
Thomas Collins (cricketer, born 1841) (1841–1934), English cricketer
Thomas D. Collins (1847–1935), American soldier who fought in the American Civil War
Thomas Collins (bishop of Meath) (1873–1927), Irish Anglican bishop
Thomas Collins (Australian politician) (1884–1945), Australian MP and Postmaster-General
Thomas Collins (cricketer, born 1895) (1895–1964), English cricketer
 Thomas LeRoy Collins (1909–1991), governor of Florida
Thomas Patrick Collins (1915–1973), American-born Catholic bishop in Bolivia
Thomas H. Collins (born 1946), Commandant of the United States Coast Guard
Thomas Christopher Collins (born 1947), Canadian Roman Catholic Cardinal
Tim Collins (disambiguation), multiple people, one of several people including:
Tim Collins (footballer) (1889–?), Australian rules footballer
Tim Collins (financier) (born 1956), American businessman and financier
Tim Collins (British Army officer) (born 1960), British army officer 
Tim Collins (politician) (born 1964), British politician
Tim Collins (baseball) (born 1989), American Major League Baseball pitcher
Tim Collins (manager), former manager for the band Aerosmith
Tod and Todd Collins (disambiguation), multiple people, one of several people including:
Tod Collins (1876–1942), Australian rules footballer
Todd Collins (linebacker) (born 1970), American football linebacker
Todd Collins (quarterback) (born 1971), American football quarterback
Tom and Tommy Collins (disambiguation), multiple people, one of several people including:
 Tom Collins, pseudonym of Joseph Furphy (1843–1912), Australian author
Tom Collins (footballer) (1882–1929), Scottish international footballer
Tom Francis Collins (1886–1907), English drifter convicted of murder in New Brunswick
Tom Collins (athlete), Irish athlete who held the 5 mile world's record
Tom Collins (rugby, born 1895) (1895–1957), rugby union international and rugby league footballer of the 1920s
Tom Collins (dual player) (died 2008), hurler and Gaelic footballer from County Kerry, Ireland
Tom Collins (boxer) (born 1955), British boxer
Tommy Collins (singer) (1930–2000), stage name of Leonard Sipes, American country music singer-songwriter
Tommy Collins (filmmaker), Irish film director and producer
Tony Collins (disambiguation), multiple people, one of several people including:
Tony Collins (footballer) (1926–2021), first black manager in the English Football League
Tony Collins (American football) (born 1959), American football player
Tony Collins (historian), British social historian
Tory Collins (born 19??), American footballer
Tru Collins (born 1986), American actress and indie-pop singer
Tyler Collins (singer) (born 1965), American singer
Tyler Collins (baseball) (born 1990), American baseball player

V
Valentine Collins (1894–1918), British World War I flying ace
Victor Collins, Baron Stonham (1903–1971), British politician
Vinson Allen Collins (1867–1966), Texas politician
Vivianne Collins (born 1973), American TV host

W
Warwick Collins (1948–2013), British novelist
Wayne M. Collins (1900–1974), American civil rights attorney
Wilkie Collins (1824–1889), British writer
William Collins, one of several people including:
William Collins (Roundhead), English politician who sat in the House of Commons from 1654 to 1659
William Collins (poet) (1721–1759), English poet
William Collins (colonist), (1760–1819) English naval officer and early settler in Tasmania, Australia
William Collins (painter) (1788–1847), English landscape artist
William Collins (publisher) (1789–1853), Scottish publisher; founder of Collins publishing house
William Lucas Collins (1815–1887), English author and clergyman of the Church of England
William Collins (Lord Provost) (1817–1895), Scottish temperance movement activist
William Collins (New York politician) (1818–1878), U.S. congressman from New York
William Collins (cricketer, born 1837) (1837–1876), Australian cricketer
William Whitehouse Collins (1853–1923), New Zealand Member of Parliament for Christchurch
William Collins (New Zealand surgeon) (1853–1934), surgeon, politician, played rugby for England and cricket in New Zealand
William Collins (surgeon) (1859–1946), British surgeon and Liberal Party politician
William Wiehe Collins (1862–1951), English architectural and landscape genre painter
William Collins (bishop) (1867–1911), Bishop of Gibraltar in the Church of England
William Collins (cricketer, born 1868) (1868–1942), English cricketer
William Henry Collins (1878–1937), Canadian geologist
 William Floyd Collins (1887–1925), American cave explorer
William J. Collins (1896–1981), president of St. Ambrose University
William Collins (canoeist) (1932–1993), Canadian canoeist who competed in the 1956 Summer Olympics
William A. Collins (1935–2022), American politician, state representative and mayor
Wilson Collins (1889–1941), American baseball outfielder
Winifred Collins (1911–1999), Chief of Naval Personnel for Women, US Navy

Z
Zach Collins (born 1997), American basketball player
Zack Collins (born 1995), American baseball player
Zaven Collins (born 1999), American football player

Fictional characters
Barnabas Collins, fictional vampire from Dark Shadows
Chris Collins, a character in the 1990 American natural horror comedy movie Arachnophobia
David Collins (Dark Shadows), fictional character from Dark Shadows
David Collins (EastEnders), fictional character from EastEnders
Gordon Collins (Brookside), fictional character from British soap opera Brookside
Molly Collins, fictional character from The Amazing World of Gumball
Jeremiah Collins, fictional character from Dark Shadows
Quentin Collins, fictional werewolf from Dark Shadows
Rusty Collins, fictional character from X-Factor comics
Tom Collins (Rent character), character in the rock musical Rent
Victor Collins (General Hospital), a fictional character in the U.S. TV soap opera General Hospital
Wesley Collins, fictional character from Power Rangers Time Force
Mr William Collins, character in the Jane Austen novel Pride and Prejudice
 Mr Emery Collins (Mr Collins), the mean Manager in Ghost Dad played by Barry Corbin

See also
Collins (given name)
Collins (disambiguation), multiple people
Collins class submarine, six Australian-built diesel-electric submarines used in the Royal Australian Navy
Collins English Dictionary, printed and online English Dictionary
The Collins Bird Guide, field guide to the birds of the Western Palearctic
The Collins College of Hospitality Management, part of the California State Polytechnic University, Pomona
The Collins Companies, American forest products company
The Collins Kids, American rockabilly duo
Sam Collins Day, local holiday in parts of Connecticut
Tom Collins, cocktail
William Collins, Sons, Scottish printing company
William Collins (imprint), a non-fiction publishing brand launched by HarperCollins in 2014

References

English-language surnames
Surnames of Old English origin
Surnames of Irish origin
Surnames of Welsh origin
Patronymic surnames